Rob Thompson (born 29 August 1991) is a New Zealand rugby union player who currently plays centre for  in New Zealand's domestic Mitre 10 Cup and the  in the international Super Rugby competition.

Early career

Originally hailing from Manawatu, Thompson started out his rugby career playing club rugby in his home province for University while working as a storeman. After failing to be picked in the Manawatu Turbos ITM Cup squad in 2012, he headed south to try out for Canterbury's Colts side. His development continued in 2013 when he was selected for the Crusaders Knights squad during the first half of the year and the Canterbury ITM Cup team in the latter part.

Senior career

Although Thompson wasn't initially named in the   squad for the 2013 ITM Cup, injuries and All Blacks call-ups meant that Thompson was promoted from the wider training group and went on to become a key player as the red and blacks were crowned ITM Cup Premiership champions.   He made 10 appearances and scored 4 tries in his first year of provincial rugby and was subsequently promoted to Canterbury's full squad for 2014.   The Cantabrians failed to defend their Premiership crown in 2014 but Thompson did feature in all 11 of their games during a season which culminated with elimination at the hands of local rivals,  at the semi-final stage.

His try haul of 10 included a hat-trick in Round 4, a 57-7 win over his home province, Manawatu. Canterbury made it back to back provincial titles in 2016 and 8 titles in 9 years with an MCL strain restricting Thompson to just 6 appearances in which he managed an impressive haul of 4 tries including one in the final, a 43-27 win over Tasman.

Super Rugby

Thompson's form during the 2013 ITM Cup brought him to the attention of Christchurch-based Super Rugby franchise, the  who named him as a member of their wider training group for the 2014 Super Rugby season during which he made a total of 2 appearances. 
However, the following year he found himself without a Super Rugby contract and had to rebuild his career in club rugby.

In October 2015, after a successful season with Canterbury in which he was the ITM Cup's joint leading try scorer; he revealed that he had signed a two-year contract with the Dunedin-based  for the 2016 Super Rugby season. He was retained in the squad for the 2017 season.

International

On 27 October 2016, Thompson was called up to the Māori All Blacks squad as an injury replacement for Declan O'Donnell ahead of the 2016 end-of-year rugby union internationals, however a hamstring injury picked up during the Mitre 10 Cup final meant that he also had to withdraw and saw his place taken by Ambrose Curtis on 30 October.

Career Honours

Canterbury

National Provincial Championship - 2013, 2015, 2016

Super Rugby Statistics

References

1991 births
New Zealand rugby union players
New Zealand Māori rugby union players
Ngā Rauru people
Ngāti Kahungunu people
Rugby union centres
Rugby union wings
Crusaders (rugby union) players
Highlanders (rugby union) players
Canterbury rugby union players
People educated at Palmerston North Boys' High School
Living people
People from Pahiatua
Manawatu rugby union players
Toyota Verblitz players
Rugby union players from Manawatū-Whanganui